Vicente D. Millora (February 22, 1933 – July 9, 2020) was the former chairman of the Kilusang Bagong Lipunan (KBL) party in the Philippines. He previously served as the National President of the Integrated Bar of the Philippines.

In January 1988, Millora and other Ferdinand Marcos loyalists declared their exit from the KBL to form a new party called the Loyalist Party of the Philippines (LPP), of which Millora was president.

On July 9, 2020, Millora died due to renal failure aged 87.

References

1933 births
2020 deaths
20th-century Filipino lawyers
Kilusang Bagong Lipunan politicians
Liberal Party (Philippines) politicians